Jakobína Jakobsdóttir (born 21 November 1932) is an Icelandic alpine skier. She competed in three events at the 1956 Winter Olympics.

References

1932 births
Living people
Icelandic female alpine skiers
Olympic alpine skiers of Iceland
Alpine skiers at the 1956 Winter Olympics
Sportspeople from Reykjavík
20th-century Icelandic women